Review is an American mockumentary comedy television series starring Andy Daly as professional critic Forrest MacNeil, who provides reviews of real-life experiences. The series was developed by Daly, Jeffrey Blitz and Charlie Siskel, and is an adaptation of the Australian television series Review with Myles Barlow. It premiered in the United States on March 6, 2014, on Comedy Central, and ended on March 30, 2017, with a total of 22 episodes over the course of three seasons.

Premise
The series uses "mockumentary" techniques to depict the fictional, reality television-style adventures of enthusiastic professional critic Forrest MacNeil, who hosts a TV show called Review in which he engages in any life experience his viewers ask him to (to judge if the experience "is any good"). Afterward, Forrest formally rates each life experience in-studio, on a five-star scale. However, Forrest's compulsive curiosity and uncompromising commitment to the show unexpectedly backfire in ways that increasingly impact his own formerly ideal real life.

Cast

Starring
 Forrest MacNeil (Andy Daly) – star of the show (-within-a-show) Review; a naïve, repressed Southern California suburbanite, who wears exactly the same clothes in every episode; a good-natured and mild-mannered intellectual, Forrest sees the show as a way to help people understand their world (by indulging their natural curiosity); as a result, he carries out each life experience/viewer request no matter what the cost(s) – ignoring his instincts, compromising personal well-being and relationships, and violating social norms and laws, along the way.

Recurring
 A.J. Gibbs (Megan Stevenson) – Forrest's cheerful and expressive co-host, whose wardrobe changes each episode (and sometimes, within the same episode); she activates the review selection system, presents the chosen review to the audience, banters with Forrest, and serves as the show's (often ignored) voice of reason.
 Suzanne MacNeil (Jessica St. Clair) – Forrest's happy wife of 14 years turned hostile ex-wife. Without warning or explanation, Forrest starts divorce proceedings against Suzanne (in season one's third episode), merely because a viewer wondered what a divorce would be like. The divorce leaves Forrest and Suzanne emotionally devastated, but Suzanne soon follows through with it—to Forrest's shock and dismay. She becomes close with her younger, male divorce attorney, and Forrest jealously assumes the two are in a sexual relationship. Having lost his best/only friend, his house, half of his money, and full custody of their son, Forrest obsessively launches a series of short-sighted schemes that are designed to win Suzanne back, but are derailed by his prioritizing the show over anything (and anyone) else.
 Lucille (Tara Karsian) – Forrest's dour, disapproving-but-grudgingly-loyal executive assistant; her general apathy, and lack of respect for her boss (due to Forrest's lack of common sense and self-awareness), is on near-constant display; Forrest generally ignores her attempts to save him from himself.
 Josh (Michael Croner) – The show's unpaid college intern; fun-loving and immature, Forrest frequently exploits him.
 Grant Grunderschmidt (James Urbaniak) – Forrest's (usually) blank-faced and taciturn producer; pushes Forrest to finish assignments he otherwise would not.
 Jack T. Walthall (Fred Willard) – Forrest's accidentally ironic, sweet-yet-tactless, 75-year-old ex-father-in-law. He is killed during the "Space" review when he forgets to fasten his seatbelt while going to space with Forrest. (Seasons 1–2)
 Daisy (Julie Brister) – Forrest's inept attorney.
 Roger MacNeil (Max Gail) – Forrest's father, whom Forrest moves back in with after the events of season one. He loves and supports his son, though shows dismay when Forrest's dedication to the reviews seems to be dangerous to himself or others. (Season 2)
 Tina (Hayley Huntley) – Josh's girlfriend. Quick-witted and dryly humorous. (Seasons 2–3)
 Mrs. Greenfield (Lennon Parham) – A teacher that Forrest meets on the review of "Sleeping With Your Teacher", whom he seduces, sleeps with and later becomes her boyfriend. After being spurned by Forrest during the "Leading a Cult" review, she usurps the cult, and leaves him. She is killed by the FBI during the "Having the Perfect Body" review. (Season 2)

Season one guest stars include Andy Richter, Ashley Tisdale, Jason Mantzoukas, Rich Fulcher, Lance Bass, Emo Philips, Andy Blitz, and Maria Thayer.

Season two guest stars include Allison Tolman, Mary Birdsong, Johnny Pemberton, Ian Roberts, and Matt Besser.

Season three guest stars include original Australian series creator Phil Lloyd.

Production
The network initially ordered eight episodes for the first season run, but so much extra content was left over that a ninth episode was made. Every episode of the series was directed by Jeffrey Blitz.

Episodes

Series overview

Season 1 (2014)

Season 2 (2015)

Season 3 (2017)

Reception
For the first season, the review aggregator website Rotten Tomatoes reports an 87% approval rating with an average rating of 8.7/10, based on 15 critic reviews. The website's critics consensus reads, "The subversive Review lures viewers with a seemingly innocuous hook and gradually reveals a disturbing commitment to its high concept, making for one of the darkest – and uproarious – of comedies." Metacritic, which uses a weighted average, assigned a score of 71 out of 100 based on 10 critics, indicating "generally favorable reviews".

For the second season, Rotten Tomatoes reports a 100% approval rating with an average rating of 8.2/10, based on 17 critic reviews. The website's critics consensus reads, "Reviews sophomore season marks a series at its most confident and sardonic, with star Andy Daly committing a masterclass of self-destruction as the increasingly unhinged Forrest MacNeil." Metacritic assigned a score of 83 out of 100 based on 4 critics, indicating "universal acclaim".

For the third season, Rotten Tomatoes reports a 100% approval rating with an average rating of 9.3/10, based on 19 critic reviews. The website's critics consensus reads, "Reviews final season continues the brutal, mercilessly bleak, and awkwardly hilarious misadventures of its host, with enough creative momentum to suggest staying power – if it only had a chance to continue." Metacritic assigned a score of 88 out of 100 based on 6 critics, indicating "universal acclaim".

References

Notes

External links

2010s American black comedy television series
2010s American mockumentary television series
2014 American television series debuts
2017 American television series endings
English-language television shows
American television series based on Australian television series
Comedy Central original programming
Television series by Abso Lutely Productions
Television series about television
Works about divorce
Social reputation in fiction